Romesh may refer to:

Romesh Batra, Professor of Engineering Science and Mechanics at Virginia Polytechnic Institute and State University, Blacksburg, Virginia
Romesh Bhandari (1928–2013), Indian Foreign Secretary, former Lieutenant Governor of Delhi, Andaman and Nicobar Islands, former governor of Tripura, Goa and Uttar Pradesh
Romesh Chandra (1919–2016), Indian leader of the Communist Party of India (CPI)
Romesh Chander Dogra, Indian politician from the state of Punjab
Romesh Chunder Dutt CIE (1848–1909), Indian civil servant, economic historian, writer, and translator of Ramayana and Mahabharata
Romesh Eranga (born 1985), Sri Lankan-born Canadian cricketer
Romesh Fernando (born 1977), Sri Lankan former cricketer
Romesh Gunesekera FRSL (born 1954), Sri Lankan-born British author, who was a finalist in the Man Booker Prize for his novel Reef in 1994
Romesh Kaluwitharana (born 1969), former Sri Lankan cricketer
Romesh Krishantha, Sri Lankan cricketer
Romesh Chandra Mitra or Romesh Chunder Mitter (1840–1899), Indian judge and the first Indian officiating Chief Justice of the Calcutta High Court
Romesh Ranganathan (born 1978), British stand-up comedian and actor
Romesh Ratnesar (born 1975), Asian-American journalist and author
Romesh Sharma (born 1947), Indian film producer, actor and director
Romesh Thapar (1922–1987), left-wing Indian journalist and political commentator
Romesh Wadhwani (born 1947), Indian-born American billionaire businessman; founder, chairman and CEO of Symphony Technology Group
Romesh Weerawardane (born 1979), Sri Lankan chess player

See also
Judge Romesh, British comedy television show broadcast on Dave
Rometsch, German metallurgical-coachbuilding company

Indian given names
Sinhalese masculine given names
Tamil masculine given names